Henry James  Hayter (23 April 1907 – 27 March 1983) was a British actor of television and film. He is best remembered for his roles as Friar Tuck in the film The Story of Robin Hood and His Merrie Men (1952) and as Samuel Pickwick in the film The Pickwick Papers (1952), the latter earning him a BAFTA Award for Best British Actor nomination.

Early life 
He was born in Lonavala, India, and brought up in Scotland, attending Dollar Academy. He made his West End debut in the 1936 comedy The Composite Man at Daly's Theatre. His best remembered film roles include Friar Tuck in the 1952 film The Story of Robin Hood and His Merrie Men (he reprised the same role in the 1967 film A Challenge for Robin Hood) and Samuel Pickwick in The Pickwick Papers of the same year. His rotund appearance and fruity voice made him a natural choice for such roles.

Acting career 
A pupil of Dollar Academy, he became a graduate of the Royal Academy of Dramatic Art. His film career began in 1936 in Sensation, but was interrupted by World War II, during which he served in the Royal Armoured Corps. His 1946 television series Pinwright's Progress, shown on the BBC, is recognised as the first real example of the half-hour situation comedy format in the history of British television. In the film Oliver!, he played Mr Jessop, the bookshop owner. He appeared in scenes when Dodger steals a gentleman's wallet outside the bookshop and also when Oliver is in court charged with the robbery. Hayter was the Ministry doorman in the film Passport to Pimlico (1949).

His later career included roles in TV series such as The Forsyte Saga (1967) and The Onedin Line. He also appeared as Dickson Mccunn in bbc serial "Huntingtower", the book by John Buchan. Hayter also appeared in the long-running BBC department store sitcom Are You Being Served? as senior salesman Mr Tebbs in 1978. He was also the original narrator of the UK television advertisements for Mr Kipling cakes. In fact, these adverts led to his departure from Are You Being Served?; the cake company paid him a significant bonus to withdraw from the series, as they felt his reputation lent an air of dignity to their advertisements. "Who can blame an actor in his seventies for accepting money for staying at home? I, now 78, would jump at the chance!” wrote Frank Thornton (Captain Peacock) in a letter to one of Hayter's eight children in 1999.

He died in Spain in 1983, aged 75.

Partial filmography

 Sensation (1936) – Jock
 Aren't Men Beasts! (1937) – Minor Role (uncredited)
 Big Fella (1937) – Chuck
 Marigold (1938) – Peter Cloag
 Murder in Soho (1939) – Nick Green
 Come On George! (1939) – Barker
 Band Waggon (1940) – Minor Role (uncredited)
 Sailors Three (1940) – Hans
 The Laughing Lady (1946) – Ostler, Turk's Head
 School for Secrets (1946) – Warrant Officer
 Nicholas Nickleby (1947) – Ned Cheeryble / Charles Cheeryble
 Captain Boycott (1947) – Music Hall Comic (uncredited)
 The October Man (1947) – Garage Man
 The Ghosts of Berkeley Square (1947) – Capt. Dodds (uncredited)
 The End of the River (1947) – Chico
 The Mark of Cain (1947) – Dr. White
 Vice Versa (1948) – Bandmaster
 My Brother Jonathan (1948) – Tom Morse
 A Song for Tomorrow (1948) – Nicholas Klausmann
 The Fallen Idol (1948) – Perry
 Woman Hater (1948) – Mr. Burrell
 No Room at the Inn (1948) – Councilor Trouncer
 Quartet (1948) – Foreman of the Jury (segment "The Alien Corn")
 Bonnie Prince Charlie (1948) – Kingsburgh
 Once a Jolly Swagman (1949) – Pa Fox
 Silent Dust (1949) – Pringle
 The Blue Lagoon (1949) – Doctor Murdoch
 All Over the Town (1949) – Councillor Baines
 Passport to Pimlico (1949) – Commissionaire
 For Them That Trespass (1949) – John Craigie 'Jocko' Glenn
 Don't Ever Leave Me (1949) – Man with Summons
 Helter Skelter (1949) – Inn landlord (uncredited)
 Dear Mr. Prohack (1949) – Carrell Quire
 The Spider and the Fly (1949) – Mayor
 Your Witness (1950) – Prouty, Trial Witness
 Morning Departure (1950) – Able Seaman Higgins
 Night and the City (1950) – Figler, King of the Beggars (uncredited)
 Waterfront (1950) – Ship's captain
 Trio (1950) – Albert Foreman – (segment The Verger)
 The Woman with No Name (1950) – Capt. Bradshawe
 Flesh and Blood (1951) – Sir Douglas Manley
 Calling Bulldog Drummond (1950) – Bill
 Tom Brown's School Days (1951) – Old Thomas
 The Story of Robin Hood and His Merrie Men (1952) – Friar Tuck
 I'm a Stranger (1952) – Horatio Flowerdew
 The Crimson Pirate (1952) – Prof. Elihu Prudence
 The Pickwick Papers (1952) – Samuel Pickwick
 The Great Game (1953) – Joe Lawson
 Four Sided Triangle (1953) – Dr. Harvey
 Always a Bride (1953) – Dutton
 Will Any Gentleman...? (1953) – Dr. Smith
 A Day to Remember (1953) – Fred Collins
 For Better, for Worse (1954) – The Plumber
 Beau Brummell (1954) – Mortimer
 The Awakening (1954) - The Chief
 See How They Run (1955) – Bishop of Lax
 Land of the Pharaohs (1955) – Mikka, Vashtar's Servant
 Touch and Go (1955) – Kimball
 Keep It Clean (1956) – Mr. Bouncenboy
 Port Afrique (1956) – Nino
 It's a Wonderful World (1956) – Bert Fielding
 Seven Waves Away (1957) – 'Cookie' Morrow
 Carry On Admiral (1957) – Member of Parliament (uncredited)
 The Heart Within (1957) – Grandfather Willard
 Gideon's Day (1958) – Robert Mason
 The Big Money (1958) – Mr. Frith
 I Was Monty's Double (1958) – Sgt. Adams
 The Captain's Table (1959) – Earnshaw
 The 39 Steps (1959) – Mr. Memory
 The Boy and the Bridge (1959) – Tugboat Skipper
 The Moonstone (1959) – Gabriel Betteredge
 Go to Blazes (1962) – Pipe Smoker
 Out of the Fog (1962) – Tom Daniels
 Lawrence of Arabia (1962) – Arab Sheik at Council (uncredited)
 Stranger in the House (1967) – Harry Hawkins
 A Challenge for Robin Hood (1967) – Friar Tuck
 Oliver! (1968) – Mr. Jessop
 Song of Norway (1970) – Butler to Berg
 The Horror of Frankenstein (1970) – Bailiff
 Scramble (1970) – (uncredited) 
 The Firechasers (1971) – Inspector Herman
 The Blood on Satan's Claw (1971) – Squire Middleton
 Burke & Hare (1972) – Dr. Selby
 The Bawdy Adventures of Tom Jones (1976) – Briggs

References

External links
 
 

1907 births
1983 deaths
Alumni of RADA
Scottish male film actors
Scottish male television actors
People educated at Dollar Academy
British Army personnel of World War II
20th-century Scottish male actors
British male comedy actors
Royal Armoured Corps soldiers